Pinyahan, sometimes spelled Piñahan, is a barangay of Quezon City, the Philippines.

History
Barangay Pinyahan was previously part of Central District Diliman. Central District Diliman was divided into two separate entities, namely Barangay Central and Pinyahan.

Etymology
Pinyahan means "a place where pineapple is grown" in Tagalog. Prior to its subdivision by the People's Homesite and Housing Corporation, the land which occupies present-day Pinyahan was a popular place for cultivating pineapples since the 1930s, thus the name of the barangay.

Health
Several hospitals are based in Pinyahan including Lung Center of the Philippines, National Kidney and Transplant Institute (NKTI), Urology Center of the Philippines and the Armed Forces of the Philippines Medical Center along V. Luna Avenue.

Education

Pinyahan Elementary School and Flora A. Ylagan High School are public schools based in Pinyahan. The AFP Medical Service School, is located within the Armed Forces of the Philippines Medical Center.

Culture
The barangay celebrates its fiesta every May 15. The barangay patron saint is San Isidro Labrador.

Law
The barangay is also the main mailing address of the Free Legal Assistance Group (FLAG), which is the largest and most prestigious human rights legal network in the country.

References

Quezon City
Barangays of Quezon City
Barangays of Metro Manila